Intimate Reflections is a 1975 British independent drama film directed by Don Boyd and starring Anton Rodgers, Lillias Walker, Sally Anne Newton and Jonathan David. It was Boyd's first feature film and premiered at the 1975 London Film Festival. Boyd described it as a study both of sexual infidelity and the clash between youth and middle-age.

Plot
Robert and Jane are a middle-aged couple grieving over a dead daughter. Michael and Zonny are a young couple with a bright future ahead of them. The film dwells on their parallel lives.

Cast
 Anton Rodgers ...  Michael White
 Lillias Walker ...  Zonny
 Sally Anne Newton ...  Jane
 Jonathan David ...  Robert
 Peter Vaughan ...  Salesman
 Derek Bond ...  Bank Manager

Reception
The film attracted little attention outside the 1975 London Film Festival and its limited theatrical release in the UK. 
Boyd had hoped to interest British Lion in the film as a 'British Emanuelle''' but in the event they backed out, branding it as 'very specialised fare', although Michael Deeley did lend Boyd £500 to take it to the States and tart it around as his 'calling card'. However Time Out (New York)'' slated it thus

References

External links

1975 films
British independent films
Films shot in London
Films directed by Don Boyd
1970s English-language films
1970s British films